Psilogramma angelika is a moth of the  family Sphingidae. It is known from Seram in Indonesia.

References

Psilogramma
Moths described in 2004
Endemic fauna of Indonesia